The becquerel (symbol: Bq) is the unit of radioactivity in the International System of Units (SI). One becquerel is defined as the activity of a quantity of radioactive material in which one nucleus decays per second. For applications relating to human health this is a small quantity, and SI multiples of the unit are commonly used.

The becquerel is named after Henri Becquerel, who shared a Nobel Prize in Physics with Pierre and Marie Skłodowska Curie in 1903 for their work in discovering radioactivity.

Definition
1 Bq = 1 s−1

A special name was introduced for the reciprocal second (s−1) to represent radioactivity to avoid potentially dangerous mistakes with prefixes. For example, 1 µs−1 would mean 106 disintegrations per second: 1·(10−6 s)−1 = 106 s−1, whereas 1 µBq would mean 1 disintegration per 1 million seconds. Other names considered were hertz (Hz), a special name already in use for the reciprocal second, and Fourier (Fr). The hertz is now only used for periodic phenomena. Whereas 1 Hz is 1 cycle per second, 1 Bq is 1 aperiodic radioactivity event per second.

The gray (Gy) and the becquerel (Bq) were introduced in 1975. Between 1953 and 1975, absorbed dose was often measured in rads. Decay activity was measured in curies before 1946 and often in rutherfords between 1946 and 1975.

Unit capitalization and prefixes
As with every International System of Units (SI) unit named after a person, the first letter of its symbol is uppercase (Bq). However, when an SI unit is spelled out in English, it should always begin with a lowercase letter (becquerel)—except in a situation where any word in that position would be capitalized, such as at the beginning of a sentence or in material using title case.

Like any SI unit, Bq can be prefixed; commonly used multiples are kBq (kilobecquerel, 103 Bq), MBq (megabecquerel, 106 Bq, equivalent to 1 rutherford), GBq (gigabecquerel, 109 Bq), TBq (terabecquerel, 1012 Bq), and PBq (petabecquerel, 1015 Bq). Large prefixes are common for practical uses of the unit.

Calculation of radioactivity

With  = , the Avogadro constant.

Since  is the number of moles, the amount of radioactivity  can be calculated by:

Examples 
For practical applications, 1 Bq is a small unit. For example, there is roughly 0.0169 g of potassium-40 present in a typical human body, decaying at a rate of approximately 4,430 decays per second.

The global inventory of carbon-14 is estimated to be  (8.5 EBq, 8.5 exabecquerel). 
The nuclear explosion in Hiroshima (an explosion of ) is estimated to have injected  (8 YBq, 8 yottabecquerel) of radioactive fission products into the atmosphere.

These examples are useful for comparing the amount of activity of these radioactive materials but should not be confused with the amount of exposure to ionizing radiation that these materials represent. The level of exposure and thus the absorbed dose received are what should be considered when assessing the effects of ionizing radiation on humans.

Relation to the curie 
The becquerel succeeded the curie (Ci), an older, non-SI unit of radioactivity based on the activity of 1 gram of radium-226.

Conversion factors:

 1 Ci =  = 37 GBq
 1 μCi = 37,000 Bq = 37 kBq
 1 Bq =  = 
 1 MBq = 0.027 mCi

Relation to other radiation-related quantities

The following table shows radiation quantities in SI and non-SI units. WR (formerly 'Q' factor) is a factor that scales the biological effect for different types of radiation, relative to x-rays. (e.g. 1 for beta radiation, 20 for alpha radiation, and a complicated function of energy for neutrons)
In general conversion between rates of emission, the density of radiation, the fraction absorbed, and the biological effects, requires knowledge of the  geometry between source and target, the energy and the type of the radiation emitted, among other factors.

See also 
 Background radiation
 Banana equivalent dose
 Counts per minute
 Ionizing radiation
 Orders of magnitude (radiation)
 Radiation poisoning
 Relative biological effectiveness
 Rem (unit)
 Rutherford (unit)
 Sievert (biological dose equivalent of radiation)

References

External links

 Derived units on the International Bureau of Weights and Measures (BIPM) web site

SI derived units
Units of radioactivity
Units of frequency